Fast Food Rockers were a British pop group known briefly for their novelty music. The band met at a fast-food convention in Folkestone in the summer of 2003.

Career
Their most successful hit was their 2003 release "Fast Food Song", which parodies the traditional folk melody "A Ram Sam Sam". The Dutch DJ Eric Dikeb claims to have made a Dutch song out of that traditional melody in 2001, called "Pizzahaha", explaining that at that moment, he was taking part in the Dutch television show Big Diet, in which contestants had to lose as much weight as they could over a few months. Dikeb further claims to have come up with the idea to use the names of his favourite fast-food restaurants in the song. Pizzahaha did not make it to the Dutch charts, but in Belgium the band Dynamite made a big hit out of it, with a Belgian version called "De Pizzadans". It also topped the charts in Germany, called "Burgerdance", by DJ Ötzi.

The Fast Food Rockers' version, adapted by Mike Stock, Steve Crosby and Sandy Rass, was the first release of independent record label Better The Devil Records. In June 2003 it reached #2 in the UK Singles Chart, despite the criticism of cultural analysts who lamented the "collapse of culture into product placement". The single would go on to sell 150,000 copies in the UK, and was in the year-end Top 40. Their second single, "Say Cheese (Smile Please)", reached #10.

After their attempt at a Christmas single only reached #25, and an album that failed to make the charts, the group disbanded in March 2004. After the disbandment, the band members found non-music-related jobs, and in 2006, former band member Martin Rycroft left his job as a bartender to take part in the Channel 4/E4 show Boys Will Be Girls, where three former male popstars (including Russ Spencer from Scooch) tried to convincingly create a new girl band by former Brother Beyond star Nathan Moore.

In 2003, rumours surfaced that the band did not sing on their own records. However, in an interview with CBBC Newsround, Meggitt stated she "trained for three years at a performing arts school, Ria's been in the business for a long time, Martin's been in the business for a long time and we're very proud to say we do sing on [this] song".

Discography

Albums

Singles

References

External links

Band
Fast Food Rockers at Myspace
Fast Food Rockers biography, news, discography at Bubblegum Dancer

Members
Martin Rycroft's official homepage
Ria Scott's official Myspace page

Songwriters and producers
Mike Stock Official Website

English pop music groups
Musical groups established in 2003
Musical groups disestablished in 2004
Musical groups from Kent
British Eurodance groups